Sakkanmol Missile Operating Base (삿갓몰) is a North Korean military base for short-range ballistic missiles located in North Hwanghae Province, approximately 85 kilometers north of the Korean Demilitarized Zone.

History
Construction for the base was begun between 1991 and 1993 by KPA Unit No. 583. Construction for support structures began in 2004. Missile launch was conducted on March 10, 2016.

Operations
The Base is operated by the Korean People's Army Strategic Force.

See also
:ko:분류:조선민주주의인민공화국의 미사일 기지

Notes

References

Buildings and structures in North Hwanghae Province
Military installations of North Korea
Rocket launch sites